The Finland men's national squash team represents Finland in international squash team competitions, and is governed by Finnish Squash Association.

Since 1981, Finland has won one Bronze medal of the World Squash Team Open, in 1991.

Current team
 Olli Tuominen
 Henrik Mustonen
 Matias Tuomi
 Jaakko Vahamaa
 Miko Äijänen

Results

World Team Squash Championships

European Squash Team Championships

See also 
 Finnish Squash Association
 World Team Squash Championships

References 

Squash teams
Men's national squash teams
Squash
Men's sport in Finland